Sanhe is a town in Ping'an District, Haidong, Qinghai, People's Republic of China, located  southwest of downtown Haidong and 14 kilometres (9.9 kilometers) southwest of Xining Caojiabao Airport. , it has one residential community and 18 villages under its administration.

References

Township-level divisions of Qinghai
Ping'an District